Paradiopa is a genus of moths of the family Noctuidae.

Species
 Paradiopa albidisca Holloway, 1976
 Paradiopa parthenia Prout, 1928
 Paradiopa postfusca (Hampson, 1893)

References
Natural History Museum Lepidoptera genus database
Paradiopa at funet

Hadeninae